Dionysius Soter (epithet means "the Saviour")  was an Indo-Greek king in the area of eastern Punjab.

Reign
According to Osmund Bopearachchi, he reigned c. 65–55 BCE and inherited the eastern parts of the kingdom of the important late  ruler Apollodotus II. The kings share the same epithet and use the common reverse of fighting Pallas Athene, and it seems plausible that they were closely related, but relationships between the last  Indo-Greek kings remain uncertain since the only sources of information are their remaining coins. R. C. Senior dates him approximately ten years later.

Earlier scholars like Professor Ahmad Hasan Dani have dated Dionysius much earlier, between the years 115 and 100 BCE, making him the ruler of the Swat and Dir Valleys and the weak successor of Polyxenus.

Dionysios was probably pressured by the invasions of the Indo-Scythians, and also had to deal with Hippostratus, a more important king who had inherited the western part of the kingdom of Apollodotus II.

Dionysius' name echoes the Olympic wine-god Dionysos, who according to Greek mythology was also an ancient king of India.

Coins of Dionysios

Dionysius was the first in the line of late kings who issued only silver drachms, but no tetradrachms, which was likely due to his limited resources. On their obverse is a diademed portrait of the king, with Athena Alcidemus on the reverse.

He also issued bronzes with Apollo on the reverse and a tripod on the obverse. Both these types were inherited from Apollodotus II. The quality of the portraits is inferior to most earlier kings. According to Bopearachchi, Dionysius inherited only the inferior celators of Apollodotus II, which he associates with mints in eastern Punjab.

Mint-marks
One single coin of Dionysius Soter is known to have used the "boxy" mint-mark characteristic of the last Indo-Greek kings, down to Apollophanes, Strato II and Strato III, who used it exclusively of any other. He is also the first king known to have used this mint-mark, which therefore came to be during his reign.

See also
 Greco-Bactrian Kingdom
 Greco-Buddhism
 Indo-Scythians
 Indo-Parthian Kingdom
 Kushan Empire

Notes

Bibliography
 Monnaies Gréco-Bactriennes et Indo-Grecques, Osmund Bopearachchi, Bibliothèque Nationale de France.
 The Bactrian and Indus-Greeks, Ahmed Hasan Dani, Lahore Museum.
 The Indo-Greeks Revisited and Supplemented, A.K. Narain, BR Publishing Corporation.

External links
Le Roi Dionysos Le Sauveur

Indo-Greek kings
1st-century BC rulers in Asia